Israel competed at the 1997 Summer Universiade also known as the XIX Summer Universiade, in Sicily, Italy.

Medals

Medals by sport

Swimming

Men's

References

Summer Universiade
Israel at the Summer Universiade
Israel